List of Christian liturgical calendars, calendars used by predominantly Christian communities or countries, and calendars referred to as the "Christian calendar."

  used in Western Christendom
  used by Armenian Christians and Churches 
  (also known as the Alexandrian calendar)  used by Coptic Christians and Churches 
  (also known as the Ge'ez calendar or Eritrean calendar), it is also used as a liturgical calendar by Ethiopian and Eritrean Christians. 
  used in most of Eastern Christendom
  (also known as the Milanković calendar)